Pablo Martínez Andrés (born 22 February 1998) is a Spanish professional footballer who plays as a midfielder for Levante UD.

Club career
Martínez was born in Madrid, and joined AD Alcorcón's youth setup in January 2016, from ED Moratalaz. He made his senior debut with the reserves on 12 April of the following year, coming on as a second-half substitute in a 1–3 Tercera División home loss against Atlético Madrid B.

Martínez scored his first senior goal on 28 January 2018, netting the last in a 5–0 away routing of CF San Agustín del Guadalix. He made his first team debut on 17 February, as he replaced Foued Kadir in a 1–1 home draw against CD Tenerife in the Segunda División.

On 16 August 2018, Martínez joined Segunda División B side UD San Sebastián de los Reyes on loan for a year. Upon returning, he moved to Levante UD after agreeing to a three-year contract on 5 July 2019, and was assigned to the B-team in the same category.

Martínez made his La Liga debut on 1 December 2019, replacing Nikola Vukčević late into a 0–4 away loss against Getafe CF. The following 17 July, he renewed his contract until 2024, and joined CD Mirandés in the second division on a one-year loan deal on 2 October.

Upon returning, Martínez was permanently assigned in the main squad for the 2021–22 campaign, but was loaned to second division side SD Huesca on 14 January 2022. He scored his first professional goal nine days later, but in a 2–1 home loss against SD Ponferradina.

References

External links

1998 births
Living people
Footballers from Madrid
Spanish footballers
Association football midfielders
La Liga players
Segunda División players
Segunda División B players
Tercera División players
AD Alcorcón B players
AD Alcorcón footballers
UD San Sebastián de los Reyes players
Atlético Levante UD players
Levante UD footballers
CD Mirandés footballers
SD Huesca footballers